Agil Samad oglu Mammadov (30 July 1969, Qubadli District, Azerbaijan SSR – 7 August 1992, Lachin District, Azerbaijan) was the National Hero of Azerbaijan and warrior during the First Nagorno-Karabakh War.

Early life and education 
Agil Mammadov was born on 30 July 1969 in Gubadli District of Azerbaijan SSR. After graduating from secondary school No.2 in Qubadli district in 1984, he continued his education at the Khanlig Vocational School No. 126. He began his career in the Qubadli District Road Transport Department.

Personal life 
Mammadov was married and had one daughter.

First Nagorno-Karabakh War

National hero 
Mammadov was posthumously awarded the title of the "National Hero of Azerbaijan" by Presidential Decree No. 457 dated 5 February 1993. He was buried at a Martyrs' Lane cemetery in Qubadli.

Memorial 
The secondary school in which he studied was named after him. At present, this school operates in Sumgait. Some streets in Qubadli and Ganja were also named after him.

See also 
 First Nagorno-Karabakh War
 List of National Heroes of Azerbaijan

References 

1969 births
1992 deaths
Azerbaijani military personnel
Azerbaijani military personnel of the Nagorno-Karabakh War
Azerbaijani military personnel killed in action
National Heroes of Azerbaijan